Gige is a village in Somogy County, Hungary.

Etymology
The older name of the village was Gége. But according to the scientific explanation its first owner was called Gége. That could be a shorter form of Gergely or a nickname referring to his larynx.

History
According to László Szita the settlement was completely Hungarian in the 18th century.

External links 
 Street map (Hungarian)

References 

Populated places in Somogy County